Yigal Bashan (September 11, 1950 – December 9, 2018) was an Israeli singer, songwriter, and actor. He was awarded the ACUM Prize for Life Achievement in 2016.

Early life
Born Yigal Bashari in Rishon LeZion, Israel, to a family of Mizrahi Jewish (Yemenite-Jewish) descent.

Music career

Bashan was a member of the pop trio "Kmo Tzoanim" (Hebrew: "Like Gypsies") that appeared on the "Hopa Hey" Israeli children's television show. He also sang the opening theme song of the Hebrew dub of The Wonderful Adventures of Nils.

Death
On December 9, 2018, Bashan died in his home in Tel Aviv. He was 68 years old. He was later laid to rest at the Kirat Shaul Cemetery.

See also
Israeli music

References

External links
Official website

Jewish Israeli singers
Israeli rock singers
Israeli pop singers
Israeli people of Yemeni-Jewish descent
Israeli composers
Israeli male actors
Israeli Mizrahi Jews
1950 births
2018 deaths
People from Rishon LeZion